Aqua is the seventh full-length studio album by Brazilian progressive/power metal band Angra. It was released on August 11, 2010 and August 17, 2010 in Japan and Brazil, respectively. It is their last recording to feature Edu Falaschi on lead vocals, and their only studio album on which drummer Ricardo Confessori returns.

Overview 
The album features returning drummer Ricardo Confessori, who had left the band with Andre Matos and Luís Mariutti in 2000 and had been since then replaced by Aquiles Priester.

According to guitarist Rafael Bittencourt, the album was based on William Shakespeare's The Tempest. Bittencourt also states that:

Aqua was released through major labels internationally, but in Brazil the band decided to self-release it, so that they can keep control of everything related to the album, says vocalist Edu Falaschi.

Reception

Track listing

Japanese bonus track

Double digipack limited edition

Disc 1

Disc 2 (bonus disc: Edu Falaschi era)

LP

Side one

Side two

Side three

Side four (bonus tracks)

Personnel 
 Edu Falaschi – vocals
 Kiko Loureiro – guitars, choirs
 Rafael Bittencourt – guitars, choirs
 Felipe Andreoli – bass, additional guitars on #04, choirs
 Ricardo Confessori – drums, additional percussion

Additional musicians
  Amon Lima – violin on #01, 03, 06, 07, 08
  Yaniel Matos – cello on #01, 03, 07, 08
  Guga Machado – percussion on #03, 04, 05, 06, 08, 09, 10
 Maria Ilmoniemi – piano on #04, 08, 10; hammond organ on #04
  Fabrizio di Sarno – keyboards and orchestration on #05
  Nei Medeiros – keyboards and orchestration on #01, 08
  Felipe Grytz – keyboards and orchestration on #02, 04, 06, 10
  Fernanda Gianesella – choirs on #01, 06, 09
  Miriam Chiurciu – choirs on #01, 06, 09
  Gisela Freire – choirs on #01, 06, 09
  Isa Elisabetsky – choirs on #01, 06, 09
  Katya Delfino – choirs on #01, 06, 09
  Zuma Duarte – choirs on #01, 06, 09
  Luiza Gianesella – choirs on #01, 06, 09
  Debora Reis – choirs on #10
  Annah Flavia – choirs on #04
  Tito Falaschi – choirs on #01, 06, 09
  Zeca Loureiro – choirs on #01, 09
  Rodrigo Ninrod  – choirs on #01

Technical
 Angra - producer
 Brendan Duffey – producer, engineer, mixer
 Adriano Daga – producer, engineer, mixer
 Thiago "Hóspede" – engineer
 Maor Appelbaum – mastering

Charts

References

Angra (band) albums
2010 albums
Concept albums